Count Alexandre de Lur Saluces, born 20 May 1934 in Vendenesse-lès-Charolles, is a French viticulturist  who for 36 years acted as manager of Château d’Yquem, and still acts in this capacity for Château de Fargues, both Sauternais châteaux held by the Lur Saluces family for generations.

Biography

Early life 
A member of the Lur Saluces, a noble family originally from Aquitaine. Born the eighth of nine siblings, he is the son of Amédée de Lur Saluces, and of Eléonore de Chabannes la Palice, niece of Bertrand de Lur Saluces and the daughter of Eugène de Lur-Saluces.

He attended the Saint-Martin de France college in Pontoise. Then, he studied at the EDHEC Business School faculty of Law.

After his military service from 1959 to 1962, and experience working at a variety of companies, his uncle Bertrand marquis de Lur Saluces, taught him the family business of winemaking. Upon Bertrand's death on 19 December 1968, Alexandre took over management of d'Yquem until its takeover by LVMH in 1999.

Titles and distinctions 
 Knight of the National Order of Agricultural Merit
 Knight of Merit of the Italian Republic

Bibliography 

 Léo Drouyn, La Guyenne militaire, 2 vol, Bordeaux, 1865, Laffitte reprints, Marseille, 1977, .
 Marguerite Figeac-Monthus, Uza, les Lur Saluces et la mise en valeur des Landes aux  et  siècles, dans Château et innovation, Actes des Rencontres d’archéologie et d’histoire en Périgord, septembre 1999, textes réunis par Anne-Marie Cocula et Anne-Marie Dom, Ausonius-CAHMC, Bordeaux, 2000, .
 Idem, Les Lur Saluces d'Yquem, de la fin du XVIIIe siècle au milieu du XIXe siècle, Mollat, Fédération Historique du Sud-Ouest, 2000.
 Mathilde Hulot, Alexandre de Lur Saluces. Le comte en sa demeure, in "Visages de vignerons", Figures du vin, Paris, Fleurus, 2005, .
 Périco Légasse, Alexandre de Lur Saluces, Le Prince de Fargues, in Marianne, octobre 2015.
 Alexandre de Lur Saluces, La morale d'Yquem, Entretiens avec Jean-Paul Kauffmann, Bordeaux, Mollat, 1999.
 Alexandre de Lur Saluces, Marguerite Figeac-Monthus, De l'Italie vers la France, de la province vers Paris, de la Guyenne vers le Cantal : Faire revivre les Lur Saluces d'Yquem aux  et  siècles, in "Archives familiales et noblesse provinciale, La pierre et l'écrit", Grenoble, Presses Universitaires de Grenoble, 2006, .
 Richard Olney, Yquem, Paris, Flammarion, 1985.
 Nicolas de Rabaudy, Le comte de Lur Saluces s’insurge, in "Paris Match", 7 September 2007.

References

External links 
 Official site of Château de Fargues
 http://www.lous-seurrots.com/
 http://www.domaines-uza.fr/
 http://www.europe1.fr/emissions/au-coeur-de-l-histoire/acdh-lintegrale-14112016-le-chateau-dyquem-2900117

1934 births
French viticulturists
Living people
People from Saône-et-Loire
Knights of the Order of Agricultural Merit